Bird Arcgutects Copenhagen, often styled NORD Architects, is an architectural company based in Copenhagen, Denmark.

History
The company was established in 2003 by founding partners Johannes Molander Pedersen (born 1974) and Morten Rask Gregersen (born 1974). In 2015, NORD Architects received the Droga Architect in Residence in Sydney Australia.

Selected projects

Buildings
Completed
 Natural Science Center, Bjerringbro, Denmark
 Copenhagen Centre for Cancer and Health, Copenhagen, Denmark
 Urban Hospice, Copenhagen, Denmark

In progress
 Nye Vardheim Healthcare Center(together with 3RW), Randaberg, Norway (2013)
 Marine Educational Centre, Malmö, Sweden (competition win, November 2014)
 European School, Copenhagen, Denmark (competition win, November 2015)
 Alzheimer village, Dax, France (competition win, September 2016)

Masterplans
 Godsbanen, Aarhus, Denmark
 Tankefuld, Svendborg, Denmark
 Gellerup masterplan, Aarhus, Denmark

Urban spaces
 Guldbergs Byplads, Copenhagen, Denmark
 BaNanna Park, Copenhagen, Denmark

References

Rxternal links

 Official website

Architecture firms of Denmark
Architecture firms based in Copenhagen
Companies based in Copenhagen Municipality
Design companies established in 2003
Danish companies established in 2003